Brian Muir (30 June 1931 – 11 September 1983) was an Australian racing driver.

Career
He achieved successful seasons competing in saloon car racing. In 1965 he finished third overall in the Australian Touring Car Championship. In 1968 he finished as runner-up in the British Saloon Car Championship driving a Ford Falcon behind fellow Australian Frank Gardner. Two years later he finished third in the BTCC, following up that result with a victory in the RAC Tourist Trophy, the longest running and one of the most prestigious prizes in international motorsport, later that year. He drove a Chevrolet Camaro to the checkered flag, making him the first Australian to claim the trophy. He finished runner-up in the European Touring Car Championship in 1973. He also regularly competed in the 24 Hours of Le Mans driving alongside the likes of Jackie Oliver, Graham Hill and Jacky Ickx, and he won the 1000 km Catalunya in 1968 (with Francisco Godia Sales).

The last race Muir competed in was the RAC Tourist Trophy before dying on his way home.

Career results

Racing record

Complete Australian Touring Car Championship results
(key) (Races in bold indicate pole position) (Races in italics indicate fastest lap)

Complete British Saloon Car Championship results
(key) (Races in bold indicate pole position; races in italics indicate fastest lap.)

† Events with 2 races staged for the different classes.

Complete Phillip Island / Bathurst 500 / 1000 results

References

External links
Brian Muir at driver database

1931 births
1983 deaths
Australian racing drivers
24 Hours of Le Mans drivers
British Touring Car Championship drivers
Australian Touring Car Championship drivers
World Sportscar Championship drivers